The First Battle of Anandpur in 1704 was fought between the Mughal Empire and the Sikhs.

The Battle

The Mughals were defeated in the First Battle of Chamkaur earlier in the year, therefore the Mughal emperor Aurangzeb sent a fresh force under General Ramjan Khan to Anandpur. General Sayyid Khan was replaced by General Ramjan Khan. In the battle, Ramjan Khan was severely wounded while battling against the Sikh army at the well militarised fort of Anandpur Sahib. Hence, with failure of all the efforts, the Mughal forces were repulsed by the Sikhs, causing the Mughals to retreat.

References

Anandpur
History of Sikhism
History of Punjab, India
1704 in India